The 2019 VFF National Super League is the 9th edition of the VFF National Super League, the highest tier football league in Vanuatu apart from Port Vila. Most games took place at the 10,000-capacity Port Vila Municipal Stadium, the 6,500-capacity Korman Stadium and the 6,000-capacity Luganville Soccer Stadium.

First stage

Northern Region

Luganville Top 3
The Top 3 teams from 2018 Luganville Premier League played against each other for two spots in Semifinals

 Santos FC (Luganville)
 Malampa Revivors (Luganville) 
 Vaum United (Luganville)

Malampa Revivors and Vaum United advanced to semifinals

Southern Region
GROUP D: Eastern Nesia (Tafea), Nuvi (Shefa), Fatukei (Shefa), Milo (Shefa) 
GROUP E: Fenua Temanu Bakou (Shefa), Medics FC (Tafea), LL Echo (Tafea), Lewelkas (Tafea)

The two winners are qualified for semifinals

GROUP D: Eastern Nesia (Tafea)
GROUP E: Fenua Temanu Bakou (Shefa)

Final stage

Teams
Four teams from the seven Vanuatu football associations (other than Port Vila) qualified, with two from the Northern Region and two from the Southern Region.
Eastern Nesia (Southern Region)
Fenua Temanu Bakou (Southern Region)
Malampa Revivors (Northern Region)
Vaum United (Northern Region)

Semi-finals

Final
Winner of the Final qualifies for the 2020 OFC Champions League group stage and the 2019 VFF National Super League grand final.

Grand final
The 2019 VFF National Super League Grand Final is played between two teams:

Both teams had already qualified for the 2020 OFC Champions League by winning their respective competitions. The Grand Final decides the seeding of the two teams in the OFC Champions League, with the winner seeded as Vanuatu 1 and the runner-up seeded as Vanuatu 2.

Grand Final clubs' stadiums

See also
2018–19 Port Vila Premier League

References

VFF National Super League seasons
Vanuatu
2018–19 in Vanuatuan football